Nayib Bukele is the 46th and current president of El Salvador.

Bukele may also refer to:

 Gabriela Rodríguez de Bukele, wife of Nayib Bukele
 Armando Bukele Kattán, father of Nayib Bukele
 Xavier Zablah Bukele, cousin of Nayib Bukele
 Momolu Duwalu Bukele, inventor of the Vai language's writing system